Eagletown may refer to:

Eagletown, Indiana
Eagletown, Oklahoma